Chasmias is a genus of parasitoid wasps belonging to the family Ichneumonidae.

The species of this genus are found in Europe, Japan and Northern America.

Species:
 Chasmias fuscus Uchida, 1926 
 Chasmias lugens (Gravenhorst, 1829)

References

Ichneumonidae
Ichneumonidae genera